Semmingsen is a Norwegian surname. Notable people with the surname include:

Ingrid Semmingsen (1910–1995), Norwegian historian
Rolf Ingvar Semmingsen (1908–1979), Norwegian civil servant
Tuva Semmingsen (born 1975), Norwegian mezzo-soprano and coloratura singer

Norwegian-language surnames